Klimov is a rural locality (a khutor) in Alexeyevsky District, Belgorod Oblast, Russia. The population was 173 as of 2010. There is 1 street.

Geography 
Klimov is located 30 km southwest of Alexeyevka (the district's administrative centre) by road. Khreshchaty is the nearest rural locality.

References 

Rural localities in Alexeyevsky District, Belgorod Oblast
Biryuchensky Uyezd